Penicillium ellipsoideosporum is a species of the genus of Penicillium which was isolated in China.

See also
 List of Penicillium species

References

ellipsoideosporum
Fungi described in 2000